Volha Ziuzkova (born June 14, 1983) is a Belarusian basketball player for Hoptrans Sirenos and the Belarusian national team, where she participated at the 2014 FIBA World Championship.

References

1983 births
Living people
Belarusian women's basketball players
Point guards
People from Masty
Basketball players at the 2016 Summer Olympics
Olympic basketball players of Belarus
Belarusian expatriate basketball people in Lithuania
Sportspeople from Grodno Region